The Delaware-Lackawanna Railroad  is a shortline railroad operating in Northeastern Pennsylvania, especially the Scranton area.

It is a subsidiary of holding company Genesee Valley Transportation Company, Inc. (GVT). It was founded by Jeffrey Baxter, Charles Riedmiller, John Herbrand, Michael Thomas and David Monte Verde who continue to make up its corporate ownership.

Overview
GVT began in 1985 in upstate New York marketing rail-related services to both private and public industry throughout the northeast.

Under contract with the Pennsylvania Northeast Regional Rail Authority who owns the rail assets and properties. GVT operates within Lackawanna, Wayne, Monroe, and Northampton counties from Scranton northeast to the city of Carbondale on the former Delaware & Hudson Railway's Penn Division mainline (now called the Carbondale Mainline), from Scranton southeast to Slateford Junction in Monroe County on the former Delaware, Lackawanna & Western Railroad's (DL&W) Southern Division mainline (now called the Pocono Mainline), and from Scranton southwest to Montage Mountain and Minooka on lines of the former Lackawanna & Wyoming Valley Railroad electric interurban streetcar line, known as the Laurel Line. The line is still known as the Laurel Line with the Minooka Industrial Track connected to it.  

As of 2022 there are about 25 active rail industries in the region with the possibility of several new rail dependent industrial prospects for the region.

These are the lines hosting the seasonal passenger trains of both the Steamtown National Historic Site, the Electric City Trolley Museum, and the Erie Lackawanna Dining Car Preservation Society. The Pocono Mainline has hosted a number of excursions out of Steamtown, including excursions of the Nickel Plate 765. 

In 2015 the authority extended DL's lease for five years.

Poconos expansion
The DL interchanges with Norfolk Southern Railway in Taylor, Pennsylvania, Norfolk Southern in Portland, Pennsylvania via Slateford Junction near Delaware Water Gap, Pennsylvania, and the Reading Blue Mountain & Northern Railroad via Duryea Yard outside Pittston, Pennsylvania, thus connecting to the Great Lakes via Sayre Yard and New Jersey and New York City via former Central Railroad of New Jersey (CNJ) assets. 

In the summer of 1998, under a haulage agreement with Canadian Pacific Railway (CP), the DL had operated unit Canadian grain trains between Taylor, Pennsylvania and the Ardent Mills Grain Mill at Pocono Summit, Pennsylvania. Operated by DL crews, these trains averaged approximately 52 cars. The grain trains to Ardent Mills Grain Mill still continue, but the haulage agreement is now with Norfolk Southern since NS now owns Taylor Yard.

Equipment roster
The DL is renowned as a bastion for both rebuilding and operating 50+ year-old ALCO diesels on a daily basis. It is the only railroad operating four ALCO RS-3s and the owner of the only ALCO C636 in existence.

A new unified color scheme of gray and white with red and yellow stripes was to be applied to GVT system units beginning in 2006 as they exit the South Scranton shops; the most recent being rebuilt ALCO C425 No. 2457 in the summer of 2016. No. 3000 appeared in September 2016.

Recent activity
A new 2,000-foot extension connects the county's trolley line, the Electric City Trolley Museum, from the Steamtown National Historic Site, Scranton, to a new station and trolley restoration facility, immediately adjacent to the Scranton/Wilkes-Barre RailRiders stadium, PNC Field, off Montage Mountain Road in Moosic.
The 2006 Annual Convention of the American Association of Private Railroad Car Owners (AAPRCO) took place in Scranton on DL at the Steamtown National Historic Site on site behind the Mall at Steamtown September 20–24, 2006, traveling via Cincinnati-Chicago-St. Albans, Vermont-Scranton-Chicago-Cincinnati route over the 14-day event. Many past Presidential and historic rail cars attended with a round-trip steam-powered run to the Delaware Water Gap on September 21, 2006.
The 2010 Annual Convention of the National Railway Historical Society took place in Scranton on June 22–26, 2010, with numerous events run on DL lines.
DL has been the motive power for several trips run by the Erie-Lackawanna Dining Car Preservation Society, a preservation group that owns and operates several historic passenger cars, including a Nickel Plate Road (NKP) Pullman sleeper and two Budd Company dining cars from DL&W's Phoebe Snow.
In connection with the Anthracite Railroads Historical Society, DL started operating a heritage fleet, including a CNJ RS-3 and Lehigh Valley Railroad C420.
Starting in 2017, Office Car Specials and inspection trains have become more frequent on DL. These trains use a mix of ELDCPS and company-owned passenger equipment, most notably NKP sleeper No. 211 City of Lima, DL&W diner No. 469, and Erie Lackawanna Railway business car No. 2.
Completed in September 2020, the DL constructed a new shop for their locomotives, the Von Storch Locomotive Shops. The new shop is located in the Green Ridge Yard in Scranton. Genesee Valley Transportation Co., Inc. Invested more than $2 million into the new shop.

References

External links

 Genesee Valley Transportation Company, Inc.
 2010 N.R.H.S. Annual Convention, Scranton, PA, June 22-26, 2010

Pennsylvania railroads
Pocono Mountains
Transportation in Lackawanna County, Pennsylvania